The 1979 Kilkenny Senior Hurling Championship was the 85th staging of the Kilkenny Senior Hurling Championship since its establishment by the Kilkenny County Board.

Ballyhale Shamrocks were the defending champions.

On 11 November 1979, Ballyhale Shamrocks won the championship after a 3-12 to 1-06 defeat of Erin's Own in a final replay. It was their second championship title overall and their second title in succession.

Results

Semi-finals

Finals

Championship statistics

Miscellaneous

 The drawn final was a unique occasion for the Fennelly family who represented the Ballyhale Shamrocks club. Seven brothers - Ger, Kevin, Brendan, Mick, Seán and Liam - scored the entire Ballyhale total of 0-14.
 The final replay ended in chaos when the referee abandoned the game with ten minutes to go when an Erin's Own player refused to leave the field after being sent off.

References

Kilkenny Senior Hurling Championship
Kilkenny Senior Hurling Championship